Highway 301 is a highway in the Canadian province of Saskatchewan. It runs from the Highway 1-Highway 39 intersection near Pasqua (east of Moose Jaw) to Highway 202 near Buffalo Pound Provincial Park.

Highway 301 also passes through Pleasant Mount.

References

External links
Buffalo Pound Provincial Park

301